Villa Porvenir is a caserio (small village) in the Canelones Department of Uruguay.

Geography

Location
It is located on the north side of Route 6 on its Km. 25.5 and on its intersection with Tomas Berreta street. It lies directly northeast of Toledo and directly southwest of Villa San José and Villa San Felipe.

Population 
In 2011 Villa Porvenir had a population of 507.
 
Source: Instituto Nacional de Estadística de Uruguay

References

External links 
 Map of Villa Porvenir (PDF; 80 kB)

Populated places in the Canelones Department